Earth Spirit (1895) (Erdgeist) is a play by the German dramatist Frank Wedekind. It forms the first part of his pairing of 'Lulu' plays; the second is Pandora's Box (1904), both depicting a society "riven by the demands of lust and greed". In German folklore an erdgeist is a gnome, first described in Goethe's Faust (1808). Together with Pandora's Box, Wedekind's play formed the basis for the silent film Pandora's Box (1929) starring Louise Brooks and the opera Lulu by Alban Berg (1935, premiered posthumously in 1937).

In the original manuscript, dating from 1894, the ‘Lulu’ drama was in five acts and subtitled ‘A Monster Tragedy’. Wedekind subsequently divided the work into two plays: Earth Spirit (German: Erdgeist, first printed 1895) and Pandora’s Box (German: Die Büchse der Pandora, first performed 1904). The premiere of Earth Spirit took place in Leipzig on 25 February 1898, in a production by Carl Heine, with Wedekind himself in the role of Dr Schön. Wedekind is known to have taken his inspiration from at least two sources: the pantomime Lulu by Félicien Champsaur, which he saw in Paris in the early 1890s, and the sex murders of Jack the Ripper in London in 1888.  The Lulu character may also have been partially inspired by the famed dancer/courtesan Lola Montez, also a woman of humble origin who fabricated an exotic identity.

Plot

In a Prologue, the characters in the drama are introduced by an ‘Animal Tamer’ as if they are creatures in a travelling circus. Lulu herself is described as “the true animal, the wild, beautiful animal” and the “primal form of woman”. 

When the action of the play starts, Lulu has been rescued by the rich newspaper publisher Dr Schön from a life on the streets with her alleged father, the petty criminal Schigolch. Dr Schön has taken Lulu under his wing, educated her and made her his lover. Wishing however to make a more socially advantageous match for himself, he has married her off to the medic Dr Goll.

In the first Act Dr Goll has brought Lulu to have her portrait painted by Schwarz. Left alone with him, Lulu seduces the painter. When Dr Goll returns to confront them, he collapses with a fatal heart attack.

In Act Two, Lulu has married the painter Schwarz, who, with Schön’s assistance, has now achieved fame and wealth. She remains Schön’s mistress, however. Wishing to be rid of her ahead of his forthcoming marriage to a society belle, Charlotte von Zarnikow, Schön informs Schwarz about her dissolute past. Schwarz is shocked to the core and “guillotines” himself with his razor.

In Act Three Lulu appears as a dancer in a revue, her new career promoted by Schön’s son Alwa, who is now also infatuated with her. Dr Schön is forced to admit that he is in her thrall. Lulu forces him to break off his engagement to Charlotte.

In Act Four Lulu is now married to Dr Schön but is unfaithful to him with several other people (Schigolch, Alwa, the circus artist Rodrigo Quast and the lesbian Countess Geschwitz). On discovering this, Schön presses a revolver into her hand, urging her to kill herself. Instead, she uses it to shoot Schön, all the while declaring him the only man she has ever loved. She is imprisoned for her crime.

Her escape from prison with the aid of Countess Geschwitz and subsequent career down to her death at the hands of Jack the Ripper in London are the subject of the sequel, Pandora’s Box. It is now customary in theatre performances to run the two plays together, in abridged form, under the title Lulu.

Reception

The play has attracted a wide range of interpretations, from those who see it as misogynistic to those who claim Wedekind as a harbinger of women's liberation. Central to these divergent readings is the ambiguous figure of Lulu herself. Arguably, she embodies not so much the "primal form of woman" (a nebulous and subjective concept) as perceptions – in particular, male perceptions – of that "primal form". It is significant that we never learn Lulu's true name, only the names imposed on her by a succession of lovers. To Schigolch she is "Lulu", an asexual name suggestive of children's earliest speech. To Schön she is "Mignon", the name of the mysterious girl in Goethe's Wilhelm Meister's Apprenticeship who pursues the hero with submissive fidelity. To Schwarz she is Eve, mankind's first mother but also alleged agent (in the biblical narrative) of our undoing. Each man, secure in the patriarchal society to which she is a potential affront, finds in her what he wants to see; her own needs, meanwhile, remain obscured. A key stage prop throughout the play (and its sequel) is Schwarz's portrait of Lulu, which depicts her dressed as Pierrot. By further associating his heroine with this "naïve, comic, yet also pathetic" figure, Wedekind  reminds audiences of her "essential vulnerability".

Adaptations

The play was adapted for film twice, in 1923 by Leopold Jessner, starring Asta Nielsen, and by Walerian Borowczyk for French television in 1980, starring Anne Bennant. It is currently being adapted for comics by John Linton Roberson.    The two Lulu plays were combined for the silent film Pandora's Box (1929) and for Alban Berg's opera Lulu (1937). An Italian version by director Mario Missiroli was made in 1980, starring Stefania Sandrelli. In 2011, musicians Lou Reed and Metallica released Lulu, which was a collection of songs written by Reed based on the two Lulu plays.

References
Notes

Bibliography
 Banham, Martin, ed. 1998. The Cambridge Guide to Theatre. Cambridge: Cambridge University Press. .
 Finney, Gail. 1989. Women in Modern Drama: Freud, Feminism and European Theater at the Turn of the Century. Ithaca and London: Cornell University Press. .
 Lewis, Ward B. 1997. The Ironic Dissident: Frank Wedekind in the View of his Critics. Columbia, SC: Camden House. .
 Skrine, Peter. 1989. Hauptmann, Wedekind and Schnitzler (Macmillan Modern Dramatists). London: Macmillan. .

External links
 

1895 plays
German plays adapted into films
Plays by Frank Wedekind